Mirkka Elina Rekola (26 June 1931 – 5 February 2014) was a Finnish writer from Tampere who published poems, aphorisms, essays. Her poetry was considered ‘difficult’, thus she gained wide audience as late as in the 1990s. Rekola's production has not really been the subject of research until after the mid-1990s. Liisa Enwald's 1997 dissertation Kaiken liikkeessä lepo contributed to pioneering research. In 2020, the Runopuu mural, painted by Teemu Mäenpää and produced by the Annikki Poetry Festival, was published in Tampere, as part of which is Rekola's poem "Minä rakastan sinua, minä sanon sen kaikille".

She died in Helsinki in 2014.

Works

Poems 
Vedessä palaa (1954) ("It's Burning in the Water")
Tunnit (1957) ("The Hours")
Syksy muuttaa linnut (1961) ("Autumn Moves the Birds")
Ilo ja epäsymmetria (1965) ("Joy and Asymmetry")
Anna päivän olla kaikki (1968) ("Let the Day be Everything")
Minä rakastan sinua, minä sanon sen kaikille (WSOY, 1972) ("I Love You, I Tell Everyone")
Tuulen viime vuosi (1974) ("The Wind's Last Year")
Kohtaamispaikka vuosi (1977) ("Meeting Place: Year")
Runot 1954–1978] (1979)
Kuutamourakka (1981) ("Moonlighting")
Puun syleilemällä (1983) ("Embracing a Tree")
Tuoreessa muistissa kevät (1987) ("In Fresh Memory the Spring")
Maskuja (WSOY, 1987)
Kuka lukee kanssasi (1990) ("Who Reads with You")
Maa ilmaan heitetty (1995) ("Soil Thrown in the Air")
Taivas päivystää (1996) ("The Sky's on Duty")
Virran molemmin puolin. Runoja 1954–1996 (1997) ("On Both Sides of the River")
Maskuja (2002)
Valekuun reitti (2004) ("The Route of the False Moon")

Aphorisms 
Muistikirja (1969) ("Notebook")
Maailmat lumen vesistöissä (1978) ("The Worlds in the Waters of Snow")
Silmänkantama (1984) ("As Far as I Can See")
Tuoreessa muistissa kevät, aforistiset kokoelmat (1998)
Muistinavaruus (2000) ("The Space of Memory")

Translated books 
Glädje och asymmetri (1990), - Swedish 
Joie et asymetrie (1987), Ilo ja epäsymmetria - French
88 Poems (WSOY, 2000) - English, translated by Anselm Hollo
Himmel aus blauem Feuer (2001) - German

Awards 
Tampereen kaupungin kirjallisuuspalkinto 1958, 1962, 1965
Valtion kirjallisuuspalkinto 1966, 1969, 1973, 1982
Eino Leinon palkinto 1979
Suomi-palkinto 1995
Tanssiva karhu -palkinto 1997
Vuoden runoilija -palkinto 1998
 Helsingin Yliopiston filosofisen tiedekunnan kunniatohtori 2000
Alex Matson -palkinto 2003
P. Mustapää -palkinto 2004

Nominees
Neustadt International Prize for Literature 2000
Tanssiva karhu -palkinto 2005

References

External links
 Mirkka Rekola homepage

1931 births
2014 deaths
People from Tampere
21st-century Finnish poets
Writers from Pirkanmaa
Finnish women essayists
Finnish essayists
Recipients of the Eino Leino Prize
Aphorists
Finnish women poets
20th-century Finnish poets
20th-century women writers
20th-century essayists
21st-century essayists
21st-century Finnish women writers
Finnish LGBT poets